Sunrise Festival, released in 2008, was a live album from the Ozric Tentacles, recorded 1 June 2007 at the Sunrise Celebration Festival, Somerset, England.  This recording marks the return of Merv Pepler and Joie Hinton to the band, who had left in 1994 to concentrate on their other project, Eat Static.  The second disc is a DVD containing a bonus track "The Throbbe" following "Erpland."

Track listing
"...Blimey!" – 3:20
"O-I" – 3:46
"Vita Voom" – 4:41
"Jurassic Shift" – 13:00
"Sunrise Jam" – 8:35
"Erpland" – 6:14
"Snakepit" – 4:47
"Eternal Wheel" – 10:31
"White Rhino Tea" – 6:45
"Tidal Convergence" - 10:22

The band
 Ed Wynne – guitar & keyboards
 Joie Hinton – keyboards
 Brandi Wynne – bass guitar
 Merv Pepler – drums

References

Ozric Tentacles albums
2008 live albums